Inga sarayacuensis is a species of plant in the family Fabaceae. It is found only in Ecuador. Its natural habitat is subtropical or tropical moist lowland forests.

References

sarayacuensis
Flora of Ecuador
Near threatened plants
Taxonomy articles created by Polbot